Caterina Irene Elena Maria Boyle, Lady Saunders (née Imperiali dei Principi di Francavilla; 29 May 1926 – 20 March 2018), usually known as Katie Boyle, was an Italian-born British actress, writer, radio announcer, television personality, game-show panellist and animal rights activist. She became best known for presenting the Eurovision Song Contest on four occasions, in 1960, 1963, 1968 and 1974; the first three in London and the last in Brighton, England. She was once an agony aunt, answering problems that had been posted by readers of the TVTimes.

Early life, modelling and film career

She was born in a royal palace in Florence, Tuscany, Italy, which had once belonged to the Italian royal family, the daughter of an Italian marquis (the Marchese Demetrio Imperiali di Francavilla), and his English wife, Dorothy Kate Ramsden. She came to the United Kingdom in 1946 and started a modelling career, which included work for such publications as Vogue. She also appeared in several 1950s films, the first being Old Mother Riley, Headmistress (1950) in which she was billed as Catherine Carleton, followed by I'll Never Forget You (uncredited, 1951), The Diary of Major Thompson (filmed in France in 1955), Not Wanted on Voyage (1957), The Truth About Women (also 1957), and Intent to Kill (1958).

Radio and television

Boyle was an on-screen continuity announcer for the BBC in the 1950s. A decade later she became a television personality, regularly appearing on panel games and programmes such as What's My Line? and Juke Box Jury. Boyle was the presenter for the 1960, 1963, 1968 and 1974 Eurovision Song Contests, all of which were hosted in the UK. She hosted the 1974 contest wearing no underwear; it had been cut off from under her satin dress moments before the broadcast began. She also hosted the UK qualifying heat, A Song for Europe, in 1961. In the 1960s she appeared in a long-running series of television advertisements for Camay soap.

Boyle was the subject of This Is Your Life in 1982, when she was surprised by Eamonn Andrews while in Rome. That same year she played herself in the BBC radio play The Competition, which told the story of a fictitious international song contest being staged in Bridlington. Boyle was guest of honour at the Eurovision fan club conventions staged in 1988 and 1992, and appeared at the 1998 Eurovision Song Contest held in Birmingham as a special guest of the BBC. Her other work has included theatre, television (What's Up Dog?) and radio (Katie and Friends). In 2004 Boyle was a guest on a special Eurovision-themed celebrity version of The Weakest Link on BBC One, hosted by Anne Robinson. Boyle became the first, and to date the only, contestant ever to vote herself off the programme.

Personal life

In 1947, she married The Hon. Richard Bentinck Boyle, heir to the 8th Earl of Shannon; the marriage was dissolved in 1955 but she kept his surname, Boyle. Later that year she married Greville Baylis, a racehorse owner, who died in 1976. In 1979 she married theatre impresario Sir Peter Saunders, who died in 2003. In Queen Elizabeth II: A Woman Who Is Not Amused by Nicholas Davies it is alleged that Boyle had a long-standing relationship with Prince Philip in the 1950s. Boyle told Gyles Brandreth: "It's ludicrous, pure fabrication. When it appears in print, people believe it. You can't take legal action because it fans the flames, so you just have to accept people telling complete lies about you." She was represented for most of her working life by Bunny Lewis and was a committee member of Battersea Dogs Home for more than 25 years. She died at home on Tuesday 20 March 2018.

Alternative crediting
She was also credited as Catherine Boyle and Catherine Boyl.

Filmography

Bibliography

She also wrote four books:

 Dear Katie – tips from her days as agony aunt for TV Times, 1975, 
 What This Katie Did – autobiography, 1980, 
 Boyle's Law - household tips, 1982, 
 Battersea Tales – stories of rescues from the Battersea Dogs Home, 1997

See also

 List of Eurovision Song Contest presenters

References

External links

Katie Boyle at the British Film Institute

1926 births
2018 deaths
British television presenters
British women writers
Italian emigrants to the United Kingdom
BBC Radio 2 presenters
Mass media people from Florence
20th-century British actresses
Italian nobility
Italian people of English descent
Katie
English people of Italian descent
British women radio presenters
British women television presenters
British advice columnists
British women columnists
Royalty and nobility models
Royalty and nobility actors
English female models
20th-century English women
20th-century English people
Wives of knights